In mathematics, a biorthogonal polynomial is a polynomial that is orthogonal to several different measures. Biorthogonal polynomials are a generalization of orthogonal polynomials and share many of their properties. There are two different concepts of biorthogonal polynomials in the literature:  introduced the concept of polynomials biorthogonal with respect to a sequence of measures, while Szegő introduced the concept of two sequences of polynomials that are biorthogonal with respect to each other.

Polynomials biorthogonal with respect to a sequence of measures

A polynomial p is called biorthogonal with respect to a sequence of measures μ1, μ2, ... if
 whenever i ≤ deg(p).

Biorthogonal pairs of sequences

Two sequences ψ0, ψ1, ... and φ0,  φ1, ... of polynomials are called biorthogonal (for some measure μ) if 

 

whenever m ≠ n.

The definition of biorthogonal pairs of sequences is in some sense a special case of the definition of biorthogonality with respect to a sequence of measures. More precisely two sequences ψ0,  ψ1, ... and φ0,  φ1, ... of polynomials are  biorthogonal for the measure μ if and only if  the sequence ψ0,  ψ1, ... is biorthogonal for the sequence of measures  φ0μ,  φ1μ, ..., and the sequence φ0,  φ1, ... is biorthogonal for the sequence of measures  ψ0μ,  ψ1μ,....

References

Orthogonal polynomials